Exalcidion is a genus of beetles in the family Cerambycidae, containing the following species:

 Exalcidion carenatum Monné, 1990
 Exalcidion tetracanthum Monné & Delfino, 1981
 Exalcidion tetramaston (White, 1855)

References

Acanthocinini